Bruno Bianchi may refer to:

 Bruno Bianchi (sailor) (1904–1988), Italian sailor
 Bruno Bianchi (footballer) (born 1989), Argentine football defender
 Bruno Bianchi (cartoonist) (1955–2011), French creator of Inspector Gadget
 Bruno Bianchi (athlete) (born 1939), Italian former sprinter
 Bruno Bianchi (swimmer) (1943–1966), Italian swimmer
 Bruno Bianchi (racing driver), Canadian racing driver